Kendarius DeMaureya Webster (born June 19, 1996) is an American football cornerback who is currently a free agent. He played college football at Ole Miss.

Professional career

New England Patriots
Webster was drafted by the New England Patriots in the seventh round (252nd overall) of the 2019 NFL Draft. He was released by the Patriots during final roster cuts on August 31, 2019.

Miami Dolphins
On September 1, 2019, Webster was claimed off waivers by the Miami Dolphins. He was placed on injured reserve on December 10, 2019. He finished the season with 19 tackles and a pass deflection in eight games and five starts. On September 5, 2020, Webster was waived by the Dolphins and signed to the practice squad the next day.

San Francisco 49ers
On September 16, 2020, Webster was signed to the active roster of the San Francisco 49ers off the Dolphins practice squad. He was placed on injured reserve on December 1, 2020. On January 21, 2021, Webster signed a one-year contract extension with the team. He was waived on August 16, 2021.

New York Jets
On December 22, 2021, Webster was signed to the New York Jets practice squad.

References

External links
Ole Miss Rebels bio

1996 births
Living people
People from Decatur, Georgia
Players of American football from Georgia (U.S. state)
Sportspeople from DeKalb County, Georgia
American football cornerbacks
Ole Miss Rebels football players
Miami Dolphins players
New England Patriots players
San Francisco 49ers players
New York Jets players